Clivina pallida is a species of ground beetle in the subfamily Scaritinae. It was described by Thomas Say in 1823.

References

pallida
Beetles described in 1823